Diego Henrique de Farias Cavalcanti (born 18 March 1991 in Natal, Rio Grande do Norte) is a Brazilian sprinter.

Career
He was part of the Brazilian squad in the 4 × 100 m relay at the 2011 World Championships in Athletics in Daegu, South Korea.

Achievements

References

External links

1991 births
Living people
Brazilian male sprinters
Sportspeople from Rio Grande do Norte
21st-century Brazilian people
20th-century Brazilian people